The Fish and the Sea is a Canadian short drama film, directed by Phillip Thomas and released in 2018. The film stars Maxwell Haynes as a young man living an isolated existence in an abandoned house, whose life is disrupted when a real estate agent (Sara Canning) arrives to show the house to a potential buyer (Kurt Max Runte).

At the 7th Canadian Screen Awards in 2019, the film was shortlisted for Best Live Action Short Drama.

References

External links 
 

2018 short films
2018 drama films
2018 films
2010s English-language films
Canadian drama short films
2010s Canadian films